Pražnica  is a village in Croatia on the island of Brač. It is connected by the D113 highway.

External links 

Brač
Populated places in Split-Dalmatia County